Kalateh-ye Malekeh (also Romanized as Kalāteh-ye Malekeh) is a village in Momenabad Rural District, in the Central District of Sarbisheh County, South Khorasan Province, Iran. At the 2006 census, its population was 37, in 7 families.

References 

Populated places in Sarbisheh County